"Let Me Down Gently" is a 2014 song by English singer Elly Jackson, known professionally as La Roux, from her second studio album, Trouble in Paradise. It was written and produced by Jackson, Ben Langmaid and Ian Sherwin, and produced by Sherwin and Jackson. The song was released as the album's first promotional single on 12 May 2014. La Roux performed it as the opening track on the Trouble in Paradise tour.

Background
"Let Me Down Gently" was written by Elly Jackson, Ben Langmaid and Ian Sherwin, and produced by Sherwin and Jackson. It is a synth-pop ballad, opening with a "steady electronic beat", which builds up towards a brief moment of silence, followed by a "euphoric, cathartic barnstormer, complete with skyscraping sax solo" at the end of the track. Billboard noted that "the track expertly raises in intensity until abruptly shutting off". The song's lyrics tell about a relationship breakup, and Jackson delivers them in vocals described as "pained and aloof".

"Let Me Down Gently" premiered on Zane Lowe's BBC Radio 1 show on 12 May 2014 and was made available to stream online on the same day. The track was also available as an instant download with the pre-order of Trouble in Paradise. The song received positive feedback from music critics.

Prins Thomas and George FitzGerald produced remixes of the song which were uploaded onto La Roux's official SoundCloud page, but were never released on other platforms.

Music video
The music video for the song was directed by Oliver Hadlee Pearch. It begins with Elly performing the first part of the song sitting in a grey dark room, with a stream of light coming through the only window in the ceiling. The second part of the video pictures the singer running through foggy fields, occasionally interspersed with footage of her dancing in the grey room.

Track listing
 Download/streaming
 "Let Me Down Gently" – 5:40

Credits and personnel
Credits adapted from the liner notes of Trouble in Paradise.

 Ian Sherwin – production, engineering, bass guitar, drum programming, mixing
 Elly Jackson – production, vocals, keyboards, percussion, mixing
 Ben Langmaid – engineering
 Steve White – drums
 Alan Moulder – mixing
 John Catlin – mixing assistance
 Caesar Edmunds – mixing assistance
 John Dent – mastering

Charts

Release history

References

2014 singles
2014 songs
La Roux songs
Polydor Records singles
Songs about heartache